Antonín Vranický, Germanized as Anton Wranitzky, and also seen as Wranizky (13 June 1761 in Nová Říše – 6 August 1820 in Vienna), was a Czech violinist and composer of the 18th century. He was the half brother of Pavel Vranický.

He was a pupil of Mozart, Haydn and Albrechtsberger, as mentioned in a letter from Pavel Vranický to the music publisher André.

Worklist (incomplete)

With opus number
Op. 1 Three string quartets. Published by Hofmeister around 1803. (These dates not necessarily those of their first editions- more likely republications.) 
Op. 2 Three string quartets. (in C, F and B♭) Published in Vienna by Magazin du Musique around 1790. (Duke University Library has a copy.)
Op. 4 Three string quartets. 
Op. 5 Six string quartets. Published by André, around 1800.
Op. 6 Sonatas for violin with the accompaniment of a bass (A copy is in a library in the Hague.)
Op. 7 Variations for 2 violins. (Published by André in 1807. For source see op. 6.)
Op. 8 String quintets (with two cellos).  Of these no. 2 in G minor was republished in a collection of classical string quintets by Schott in Mainz in 2005, along with quintets by František Krommer, Franz Anton Hoffmeister, Ignaz Pleyel, Giuseppe Cambini, Johann Evangelist Brandl, Václav Pichl, Gaetano Brunetti, Antonio Capuzzi, Florian Leopold Gassmann and Francesco Zanetti. André published the set as "Drei Quintetten fûr eine Violine, zwei Violen und zwei Violoncelle ... 8tes. Werk." in 1802.
Op. 9 Duos for 2 violins. (Published in 1804 by Imbault. See op. 6.)
Op. 10 String quintet for violin, two violas and two cellos. (published 1803, republished 1996) 
Op. 11. Concerto (no. 7?) for violin in C major. Published by Duhan in 1804. Republished in a more recent edition in 1958 by Český hudební found in Prague.
Op. 20 Three duos for two violins (republished by Walhall in Magdeburg, in 2002)
Op. 56 Two sonatas for violin with bass

Possibly without opus number

"Musique du carrousel éxécuté par la noblesse de Vienne"  (about 1803.)
Twenty Variations for two violins. (published in 1791 in Vienna by Magazin de musique)
Cassatio in F major for five violas or four violas and bassoon (Rarities for Strings Publications in Bristol, Conn., 1979.)
Duet for violin and cello in C minor. (Medici Music Press in Bellingham, Washington, c1985. Edited by T. Donley Thomas.)
Duet for violin and cello in G minor. (Medici Music Press in Bellingham, Washington, c1985.)
Symphonies including
Symphony in C minor, C4; edited by Eva Hennigová-Dubová and published in The Symphony in Hungary, The Symphony, 1720-1840. Series B ; v. 12. New York : Garland Publishing, Inc., 1984.
Symphony in D, also edited by Eva Hennigová, released in the series Maestri antichi boemi in 1976.
Symphony in C major from 1796 Aphrodite recorded by Vladimír Válek and the Dvořák Chamber Orchestra.
Trio for two oboes and English horn in C major. Modern publisher: Basel, Switzerland : Edition Kneusslin, c1982. (Has been recorded.)
Echo-Sonate in D major for 4 flutes; modern publisher: Zimmermann in Frankfurt, 2000
Trio in E♭ nos. 1-3, for violin, viola and horn (Hanz Pizka Edition in Kirchheim, 1997)
Concertos in A and in B♭ for violin and orchestra. (The latter published in piano reduction in 1944 by Artia, the former, in an edition edited by Jindřich Feld, was published in 1933 by Z. Vlk in Prague as "concerto no. 14" suggesting that there may be at least 12 others still. 
A violin concerto  in B♭ for violin by Antonin Vranicky - as "Anton Wranitzky"- was published by Musica Antiqua Bohemica in 1965 in piano reduction.   
Cello Concerto in D minor. Recorded by the Prague Chamber Orchestra for Supraphon in 2012.
Concerto in C major for two violas and orchestra. Recorded several times, score released in 1958 by Praha : Český hudenbní fond, 1958 edited by E. Hradecký. 
Concerto for violin and cello with orchestra. Recorded by Musica Bohemica. 
A sextet for flute, oboe, violin, two violas and cello
XII variazioni per il violino solo supra la canzonetta Ich bin liederlich du bist liederlich (published in 1798)
At least six concertante string quartets which may not have an opus number ("concertante" quartets) (played by the Martinů quartet) to add to the above. (Recorded.)
Mass in E♭ (recorded in 1985.)
Possibly an octet partita for winds (woodwinds and horns) in F major once ascribed to Joseph Haydn.
Quintet for Oboe, Violin, Viola, Cello and Double Bass in G minor

References

Dolmetsch biography of Vranicky

Further reading
Trojanová, Jaromíra. Pavel a Antonín Vraničtí: personální bibliografie. Series: Universita J. E. Purkyně v Brně. Výběrový seznam ; 194. Brno : Universitní knihovna, 1975.

External links
 

1761 births
1820 deaths
People from Nová Říše
People from the Margraviate of Moravia
Czech classical composers
Czech male classical composers
Czech classical violinists
Male classical violinists
Austrian Classical-period composers
String quartet composers
18th-century classical composers
18th-century male musicians
19th-century Czech male musicians
Pupils of Johann Georg Albrechtsberger
Pupils of Joseph Haydn